Bafa may refer to:

Bapha, a village development committee in Solukhumbu District in the Sagarmatha Zone of north-eastern Nepal
Bafa (food), a traditional dish of the Capeverdean cuisine

Abbreviations
Bangladesh Air Force Academy
British Accounting & Finance Association
British American Football Association also known as BAFA
British Arts Festivals Association
Bundesamt für Wirtschaft und Ausfuhrkontrolle, short BAFA, or Federal Office of Economics and Export Control

Others
BaFa' BaFa', a face-to-face learning simulation game